{{Taxobox
| name               = Seed and leaf gall nematode
| image              =Anguina-agrostis.jpg
| image_caption      =Anguina agrostis
| regnum             = Animalia
| phylum             = Nematoda
| classis            = Secernentea
| subclassis         = Diplogasteria
| ordo               = Tylenchida
| superfamilia       = Tylenchoidea
| familia            = Heteroderidae
| subfamilia         = Heteroderinae
| genus              = Anguina| genus_authority    = Scopoli, 1773
| subdivision_ranks  = Species
| subdivision        = See text
}}Anguina Anguina  at Department of Nematology, University of California (seed-gall nematode, seed and leaf gall nematode, seed gall nematode, shoot gall nematode') is a genus of plant pathogenic nematodes.

Species
In addition to the type species:
 Anguina tritici (Steinbuch, 1799) Filipjev, 1936
species include:

Former species
 Anguina lolii Price, 1973 now a syn. Anguina agrostis Anguina millefolii now Subanguina millefolii (Low, 1874) Brzeski, 1981
 Anguina phalaridis (Steinbuch) Chizhov, 1980 now a syn. Anguina agrostis Anguina poophila Kirjanova, 1952, now a syn. Anguina agrostis Anguina tumefaciens now Subanguina tumefaciens'' (Cobb, 1932) Fortuner & Maggenti, 1987

References 

Agricultural pest nematodes
Tylenchida
Secernentea genera